Rick Trickett is the current offensive line coach for the Jacksonville State Gamecocks and a former American football player. He served as the head football coach at his alma mater, Glenville State College in Glenville, West Virginia, in 1999. Trickett worked as an offensive line coach at a number of colleges, notably at Florida State University under Jimbo Fisher.

References

Year of birth missing (living people)
Living people
Auburn Tigers football coaches
Florida State Seminoles football coaches
Glenville State Pioneers football coaches
Glenville State Pioneers football players
LSU Tigers football coaches
Memphis Tigers football coaches
Mississippi State Bulldogs football coaches
New Mexico Lobos football coaches
Southern Illinois Salukis football coaches
Southern Miss Golden Eagles football coaches
West Virginia Mountaineers football coaches